Nafiu Belo Osagie (1 April 1933 – 18 February 2019) was a Nigerian athlete. He competed in the men's high jump at the 1952 Summer Olympics.

References

1933 births
2019 deaths
Athletes (track and field) at the 1952 Summer Olympics
Nigerian male high jumpers
Olympic athletes of Nigeria
Place of birth missing
Commonwealth Games medallists in athletics
Commonwealth Games bronze medallists for Nigeria
Athletes (track and field) at the 1954 British Empire and Commonwealth Games
20th-century Nigerian people
Medallists at the 1954 British Empire and Commonwealth Games